Fiona Millar (born 2 January 1958) is a British journalist and campaigner on education and parenting issues. She is a former adviser to Cherie Blair. She contributes to The Guardian and the Local Schools Network website.

Early life
Millar attended Camden School for Girls.  She studied economics and economic history at University College London and joined the Mirror Group's graduate training scheme in 1980.

Career
Millar began in journalism as a trainee on the Mirror Group Graduate Training Scheme in the West Country, later moving to the Daily Express, where she worked as a news reporter and lobby correspondent and was a colleague of Peter Hitchens. She was a freelance journalist between 1988 and 1995, contributing to the Daily Express, the Sunday Mirror and The House magazine, Parliament's in-house publication. In 1993, she co-authored (with Glenys Kinnock) By Faith and Daring, Interviews with Remarkable Women to celebrate the tenth anniversary of Virago Press.

Millar worked in the office of the Leader of the Opposition from 1995 to 1997, as an adviser to Cherie Blair from 1995 to 2003, as a Special Adviser to the Prime Minister Tony Blair between 1997 and 2003, as head of Cherie Blair's office, and Director of Events and Visits at Downing Street. Millar opposed the 2003 invasion of Iraq, but was pressured to stay at Downing Street because of the risk of adverse publicity. She informed Blair of her definite intention to resign after the capture of Baghdad, on the day of the toppling of Saddam Hussein's statue. The resignation was publicly announced in August 2003.

In 2003 she started writing a monthly column for The Guardian about education, and in 2004 she presented a documentary film for Channel Four called The Best for My Child, examining how the quasi-market in schools was working in practice.

In 2005, along with Melissa Benn, she co-wrote a pamphlet "A Comprehensive Future: Quality and Equality for All Our Children", and is active in the campaign against the Trust Schools white paper, appearing alongside Labour Party figures Neil Kinnock and Estelle Morris at campaign meetings.

Between 2009 and 2013 Millar was chair of Comprehensive Future, an organisation that promotes the perceived advantages of comprehensive schools in the UK. Her children attend state schools in the Camden LEA. Between 2000 and 2010 she was Chair of Governors at Gospel Oak Primary School and from 2008 was Chair of Governors at William Ellis boys' comprehensive school and an associate governor of Parliament Hill School. Millar's articles have appeared regularly in the education supplement of The Guardian newspaper since 2003.

Between 2003 and 2010 she was chair of trustees of the Family and Parenting Institute, and now chairs the National Youth Arts Trust. She also chairs the Trustee Board of the Young Camden Foundation.

Millar received the Fred and Anne Jarvis Award from the National Union of Teachers in 2009, for her campaigning for good-quality local comprehensive schools as against academies. That same year she wrote The Secret World of the Working Mother, a book about finding a balance between working and being a mother.

In 2010, Millar helped form the Local Schools Network, a pro-state schools pressure group.

In 2018 she published The Best for My Child. Did the schools market deliver? to mark the 30th anniversary of the Education Reform Act 1988.

Personal life
Millar's brother is KC Gavin Millar. Her partner is Alastair Campbell, Tony Blair's former director of communications. They have two sons and a daughter. She is a patron of the National Association for Special Educational Needs and Humanists UK.

Books

References

External links
 Grammar schools: right or wrong? (video clip)

1958 births
Living people
Alumni of University College London
British journalists
Comprehensive education
English humanists
People educated at Camden School for Girls
People from Camden Town